The Passer is a  torrent in northern Italy, a left tributary of the Adige, whose entire course lies within South Tyrol. The stream rises near the Alpine pass between Italy and Austria known as the Timmelsjoch, and flows through the Passeier Valley where the most important settlement is St. Leonhard in Passeier. The river joins the Adige at Merano, where it is a significant site for competitive canoeing, beneath the Steinerner Steg.

External links

 Agenzia provinciale per l'ambiente, ‘Torrente Passirio’, Acque superficiali (Provincia Autonoma di Bolzano - Alto Adige, 2009)
 Landesagentur für Umwelt, ‘Passer’, Oberflächengewässer (Autonome Provinz Bozen - Südtirol, 2009)

Rivers of Italy
Rivers of South Tyrol